Dodge is a given name.

People bearing it include:

 Dodge MacKnight

Fictional characters 
 Dodge Connolly, in film Leatherheads
 Brian "Dodge" Forbes, fictional character on Australian soap opera Home and Away
 Dodge Hickey, a recurring character on My Name Is Earl
 Dodge, the "well lady" of Keyhouse in Locke and Key (TV Series)